Charlatans at the Garden Gate is the debut studio album by American singer-songwriter Tristen Gaspadarek. It was released on February 15, 2011, by American Myth Recordings.

Promotion
Tristen performed a few songs from the album for Rolling Stone on June 13, 2011.

Singles
Tristen released the first music video to "Matchstick Murder" on January 4, 2011.

The second single "Baby Drugs" was released on March 10, 2011. The music video was directed by Justin Mitchell.

Critical reception
Charlatans at the Garden Gate was met with "universal acclaim" reviews from critics. At Metacritic, which assigns a weighted average rating out of 100 to reviews from mainstream publications, this release received an average score of 81 based on 4 reviews.

In a review for Paste, critic reviewer China Reevers said: "Charlatans is an exploration of love and relationships, delving deeply into private conversations, while keeping the atmosphere light with tambourines, a little bit of rock, a touch of twang and a splash of pop. Her music remains light with playful rhythms, but she keeps her songs controlled as if they were on a string." Christian Williams of The A.V. Club, described Charlatans at the Garden Gate as a "confident, poignant folk-pop debut that never wants for hooks, and manages to undercut its sing-songiness at every turn with unflinching lyrics and mature songwriting." At Rolling Stone, Will Hermes explained that Tristen's debut is "full of such moments: catchy refrains with multiple meanings, ear-tugging melodies with hidden hooks. She flaunts a philosophy major's palette amidst echoes of vintage rockabilly and girl group pop."

Accolades

Track listing

Personnel

Musicians
 Tristen Gaspadarek – guitar, piano, vocals
 Jordan Caress − bass, vocals
 Caitlin Rose – vocals
 Chris Scruggs – bass, guitar, drums
 Jeff Irwin – bass
 Matt Moody – bass
 Rollum Haas – drums
 Matt Hearn – drums
 Buddy Hughen – guitar, piano
 Richie Lister – piano
 Dave Paulson – piano
 Larissa Maestro – cello, vocals
 Ben Martin – drums
 Jeremy Ferguson – percussion

Production
 Tristen Gaspadarek – producer
 Jeremy Ferguson – producer
 Jason Lader – mixing
 Steve Fallone – mastering

References

External links
 
 

2011 albums